This was the first edition of the tournament.

Orlando Luz and Aleksandr Nedovyesov won the title after defeating Denys Molchanov and Sergiy Stakhovsky 6–4, 6–4 in the final.

Seeds

Draw

References

External links
 Main draw

2021
Kyiv Open - Doubles